Whatley Quarry,  is a limestone quarry owned by Hanson plc, near the village of Whatley on the Mendip Hills, Somerset, England.

The quarry exhibits pale to dark grey Carboniferous Limestone with small area of overlying horizontally bedded buff-coloured Jurassic oolitic limestone forming an angular unconformity, with extensive dolomitisation of top of the Black Rock Limestone. There are abundant near-vertical fissures and joints near top of limestone with karst weathering and minor pinnacle formation.

The quarry is linked by a freight only railway line, part of the former Bristol and North Somerset Railway using trains operated by Mendip Rail, to a junction with the Reading to Taunton Line near Frome station.

The quarry has been the object of protests against its impact on the environment and has had to appeal against planning application decisions because of the claimed derogation of river flows, groundwater abstractions and local
springs due to historic dewatering associated with the quarry.

Hanson runs a study centre for school children close to the quarry.

References

See also 
 Quarries of the Mendip Hills

Quarries in the Mendip Hills